Newby Hall is a country house beside the River Ure in the parish of Skelton-on-Ure in North Yorkshire, England. It is 3 miles south-east of Ripon and 6 miles south of Topcliffe Castle, by which the manor of Newby was originally held. A Grade I listed building, the hall contains a collection of furniture and paintings and is surrounded by extensive gardens. Newby Hall is open to the public.

History and media appearances
The manor of Newby was originally held by the lords of Topcliffe Castle. In St Columba's Church at Topcliffe are several monuments to the Robinson family of Newby and Rainton. After the death of Sir John Crosland in 1670, the Crosland family sold the manor of Newby in the 1690s to Sir Edward Blackett, an MP for the constituency of Ripon. He demolished the existing manor house and in 1697 built a new mansion, reputedly with the assistance of Sir Christopher Wren. In 1697, when visiting Newby, Celia Fiennes described it as "the finest house I saw in Yorkshire". Blackett was succeeded in 1718 by his son Edward, who, in turn, was succeeded by his nephew also called Edward, who in 1748 sold the estate to Richard Elcock (later Richard Elcock Weddell), to whose young son William Weddell it passed in 1762.

William Weddell (1736–1792), an MP for the constituency of Malton, benefited from his great-uncle's South Sea Company fortune and improved and enlarged the house during the 1760s. The interior was remodelled, to the designs of several architects, including John Carr and Robert Adam. The building housed William Weddell's collection of Roman antiquities which he had brought back from Italy during 1764–5. Both Robert Adam and William died in 1792, leaving the estate to Thomas Philip Robinson, Lord Grantham, who later changed his name to Thomas Weddell and was subsequently also known as Thomas de Grey, 2nd Earl de Grey. When he died in 1859, his titles passed to his nephew, George Robinson, 1st Marquess of Ripon, 2nd Earl of Ripon, but Newby Hall went to his daughter, Lady Mary Gertrude Robinson, who married Henry Vyner (1805–1861).

Lady Mary commissioned William Burges to build the Church of Christ the Consoler in the grounds in 1871–76 as a memorial to her son, who was killed by bandits in Greece in 1870. An equestrian statue brought to England by the Vyners and erected in London after the 1660 Restoration of the Monarchy, modified to depict Charles II trampling Cromwell, was re-erected at Newby in 1883. Another son, Henry Frederick Clare Vyner (1836–1883), inherited Newby, followed by his brother, Robert Charles de Grey Vyner (1842–1915), who was succeeded by his daughter Mary Evelyn Vyner, who inherited Newby herself in 1915 and had married Lord Alwyne Compton in 1886. She died in 1957.

The present owners, the Compton family, are matrilineal descendants of William Weddell. They have restored the property. The gardens, which have extensive herbaceous borders and woodland walks, were developed in their present form by Major Edward Compton, who took over Newby in 1921. His son Robert Edward John (Robin) Compton (1922–2009) was chairman of Time-Life International for many years. He took over the running of Newby Hall in 1960, was appointed High Sheriff of North Yorkshire in 1978 and Deputy Lieutenant from 1981. In 1997, Robin Compton handed over the property to his younger son, Richard, his elder son James having inherited the Invercauld estate near Balmoral in Scotland. His father, Major Edward Compton, had married Sylvia Farquharson of Invercauld.

In 1973, a miniature railway was constructed; it was enlarged in 1985. Running along the bank of the river, a train is pulled by a Battison-built 1/5-scale model of the Royal Scot (6100) on Sundays and bank holidays. At other times the train is pulled by the Countess De Grey or Lady Mary Vyner, LPG-powered diesel-hydraulic locomotives designed by David Curwen and built by Severn Lamb. 

The 2007 ITV / PBS film of Jane Austen's Mansfield Park, directed by Iain B. MacDonald and starring Billie Piper, Michelle Ryan, and Blake Ritson, was filmed on location at Newby Hall. The hall was used as the location for Hundreds Hall in the 2018 film The Little Stranger. It was featured on an episode of An American Aristocrat's Guide to Great Estates on the Smithsonian Channel and Amazon Prime Video which first aired in 2020. Newby Hall also appeared as the venue of two episodes of BBC One’s Antiques Roadshow filmed in 2020 and transmitted in January and April 2021.

In 2016, Gyles Brandreth moved his Teddy bear museum to Newby Hall.

Furthermore, the hall holds the national collection of the genus Cornus (dogwoods).

See also
Acklam Hall

Notes

References

Sources

External links

 Stately Homes
 Newby Hall
 The Blacketts of North East England
 Newby Hall Cricket Club

Grade I listed houses
Grade I listed buildings in North Yorkshire
Country houses in North Yorkshire
Gardens in North Yorkshire
Historic house museums in North Yorkshire